Robert Finlay (9 April 1923 – 8 October 1979) was a Scotland international rugby union player.

Rugby Union career

Amateur career

Finlay played for Watsonians.

Provincial career

He was capped by Edinburgh District to play against Glasgow District in the inter-city match of 1947.

International career

He was capped once for Scotland in 1948.

References

1923 births
1979 deaths
Scottish rugby union players
Scotland international rugby union players
Rugby union players from Edinburgh
Edinburgh District (rugby union) players
Watsonians RFC players
Rugby union locks